Markus Howell (born April 21, 1975) is the receivers coach for the Edmonton Elks of the Canadian Football League (CFL). He is a former professional Canadian football wide receiver and kick returner who played for 11 years for the Winnipeg Blue Bombers, Ottawa Renegades, and Calgary Stampeders. He was drafted in the fourth round of the 2000 CFL Draft by the Blue Bombers. He won a Grey Cup championship in 2008. He played college football at Texas Southern.

Professional career

Winnipeg Blue Bombers
Howell was drafted in the fourth round (25th overall) in the 2000 CFL Draft by the Winnipeg Blue Bombers. As a rookie in 2000, Howell had 258 receiving yards and one touchdown. In 2001, he recorded 307 yards and a touchdown then in 2002 he had 415 yards and a touchdown. Howell had 20 catches for 282 yards and recorded the highest touchdown mark of his Winnipeg career with two. His final season in Winnipeg, he had two catches for 17 yards. He left as a free agent after the 2004 season.

Ottawa Renegades
The Ottawa Renegades signed Howell as a free agent in 2005. He played only one season in Ottawa, before they disbanded. In his only year there he had 25 catches for 417 yards with a career-high three touchdowns.

Calgary Stampeders
He was selected by the Calgary Stampeders in the CFL Dispersal Draft. In 2006, Howell recorded twenty catches for 340 yards and a touchdown. Howell played in 17 games in 2007, mainly playing on special teams with sporadic appearances on offence. He led Calgary in all-purpose yards with 1,299 and he returned 24 kickoffs for a combined total of 475 yards. Against Saskatchewan he returned a punt for 96 yards which was a season high. In 2008, Howell was used as a backup defensive back and also played on special teams. Against the Montreal Alouettes on July 10, he brought his career kickoff return yardage to over 1,500 yards. On August 2, he returned a punt against Saskatchewan which brought his career punt return yardage to over 1,500. Then, on October 13, once again against the Roughriders he played in his 150th career game.

Howell retired on May 10, 2010.

Winnipeg Blue Bombers
On July 12, 2010, it was announced that Howell had signed a contract with his former team, the Winnipeg Blue Bombers. After one season of play with the Bombers, Howell announced his second retirement on May 9, 2011.

Coaching career
Soon after his retirement announcement, Howell joined the Blue Bombers coaching staff for the 2011 season.

On February 6, 2020, it was announced that Howell had joined the Toronto Argonauts as the team's receivers coach. The 2020 CFL season was cancelled, but Howell coached for the Argonauts in 2021 where the team finished in first place in the East Division.

On January 4, 2022, Howell formally joined the Edmonton Elks as the team's run game coordinator and receivers coach.

References

External links

1975 births
Living people
Canadian football people from Winnipeg
Players of Canadian football from Manitoba
Canadian football defensive backs
Canadian football wide receivers
Texas Southern Tigers football players
Winnipeg Blue Bombers players
Ottawa Renegades players
Calgary Stampeders players
Saskatchewan Roughriders coaches
Winnipeg Blue Bombers coaches
BC Lions coaches
Toronto Argonauts coaches